Cryptogemma powelli is a species of sea snail, a marine gastropod mollusk in the family Turridae, the turrids.

Distribution
This marine species occurs off New Caledonia

References

External links
 Zaharias P., Kantor Y.I., Fedosov A.E., Criscione F., Hallan A., Kano Y., Bardin J. & Puillandre N. (2020). Just the once will not hurt: DNA suggests species lumping over two oceans in deep-sea snails (Cryptogemma). Zoological Journal of the Linnean Society. DOI: 10.1093/zoolinnean/zlaa010/5802562

powelli
Gastropods described in 2020